Jawad Hussain is a Pakistani politician who has been a member of the National Assembly of Pakistan from August 2018 till January 2023. Previously he was a member of the National Assembly from 2008 to 2013.

Political career

He was elected to the National Assembly of Pakistan from Constituency NA-39 (Tribal Area-IV) as an independent candidate of in 2008 Pakistani general election. He received 21,844 votes and defeated an independent candidate, Gul Karim Khan.

He joined Pakistan Peoples Party (PPP) in 2013.

He ran for the seat of the National Assembly from Constituency NA-39 (Tribal Area-IV) as a candidate of PPP in 2013 Pakistani general election but was unsuccessful. He received 7,547 votes and lost the seat to Ghazi Ghulab Jamal.

He was re-elected to the National Assembly as a candidate of Pakistan Tehreek-e-Insaf (PTI) from Constituency NA-47 (Tribal Area-VIII) in 2018 Pakistani general election. He received 11,102 votes and defeated Qasim Gul, a candidate of Jamiat Ulema-e Islam (F).

References

External Link

Living people
Pakistani MNAs 2008–2013
People from Orakzai District
Pakistani MNAs 2018–2023
Year of birth missing (living people)